Aizpiri may refer to:

Aizpiri txiki, nickname of Indalecio Sarasqueta, Basque pelota player
Paul Augustin Aizpiri (1919–2016), French artists